On 13 February 2015, group of armed men wearing uniforms of security forces broke into the Shiite mosque named as Imamia mosque in the city of Peshawar, Pakistan, where people were attending Friday prayers, and opened fire, killing 19 people and injuring over 63.

See also
Terrorist incidents in Pakistan in 2015

References

2015 murders in Pakistan
21st-century mass murder in Pakistan
Massacres in religious buildings and structures
Mass murder in 2015
Suicide bombings in Pakistan
History of Peshawar
Terrorist incidents in Peshawar
Terrorist incidents in Pakistan in 2015
Attacks on religious buildings and structures in Pakistan